Briglia is an Italian surname. Notable people with the surname include:

Alessio Briglia (born 1988), Italian footballer
Mickey Briglia (1929–2006), American baseball coach
Paul Briglia (born 1940), Australian rules footballer

Italian-language surnames